Since 1978, the conflict between Republic of Turkey and various Kurdish insurgent groups, especially Kurdistan Workers' Party (PKK) caused deaths of 40,000 to 55,000 people from both sides including many civilians. Many monuments and memorials for the military and civilian casualties of the conflict were established by the Turkish government. The list below lists all memorials dedicated to victims of the conflict. For military cemeteries see List of military cemeteries to the Kurdish–Turkish conflict

List

References 

.Kurdish-Turkish conflict
Kurdish–Turkish conflict (1978–present)